The 2007–08 Texas A&M Aggies men's basketball team represented    Texas A&M University in the 2007–08 college basketball season. The team was    led by first-year head coach Mark Turgeon, who replaced Billy Gillispie in April 2007. In 2006–07, the Aggies finished 27–7 (13–3 in the Big 12), advanced to the NCAA Sweet Sixteen, and finished 9th in the final AP Poll — their first top 25 finish since the 1979–80 season.

The 2007–08 team won the NIT Season Tip-Off tournament. The 98–54 home win against Texas Tech matched the Aggies' largest margin of victory set in 1959 against Texas.

Leading into the season

Summer games
Six Aggie players participated in summer games during the summer prior to the start of the season. Junior Josh Carter participated in the Kobe Bryant Skills Academy in late June, and tried out for the Team USA basketball team for the 2007 Pan American Games. Though Carter was one of the 14 finalists to play for the team, he was one of the two who got eliminated. He later joined Athletes in Action to play several games in Australia. Incoming freshmen B.J. Holmes, DeAndre Jordan, and Nathan Walkup participated in the Global Games in Dallas in June. Jordan later joined Team USA for the under-19 world championship game in Serbia, where the team lost in the gold medal game. Sophomore Donald Sloan played for a different Athletes in Action team in the William Jones Cup in July. Sloan's team finished with a 5–4 record and tied for third place. Sophomore Bryan Davis played for the East Coast All-Stars, who went on a 10-day tour in Belgium and the Netherlands in August. Against the Dutch national team, Davis scored 16 points and made 11 rebounds. Davis' team finished with a 3–4 record.

Rankings
The preseason Big 12 Coaches' Poll picked the Aggies to finish third. The preseason Coaches Poll ranked the Aggies 14th, tied with the Gonzaga Bulldogs, and the preseason AP Poll ranked the Aggies 16th. ESPN columnist Andy Katz ranked the Aggies 17th in his "pre-preseason" top 25 rankings.

Preseason honors
Joseph Jones was named to the Wooden Award preseason top 50 list, and the preseason all-Big 12 team. Though Jones declared for the NBA draft in the summer, he withdrew himself prior to the deadline and decided to continue playing for the Aggies his senior season. Josh Carter was the 2007 NCAA leader in 3 point accuracy and currently holds the Big 12 record for career accuracy. Dominique Kirk is a Defensive All-American.

Recruiting

Players

Honors
 Senior Joseph Jones, along with Texas Longhorns player D. J. Augustin, was featured on the front cover of the November 15, 2007 issue of Sports Illustrated.
 After the Ouachita Baptist game, freshman DeAndre Jordan had made 16 consecutive field goals, breaking the Big 12 record of 13, set by Nebraska's Mikki Moore in 1998. Jordan also broke the A&M record, which was set in 1978.
 Senior point guard Dominique Kirk started his 110th consecutive game when the Aggies played Rice, breaking the Big 12 record set by Kansas point guard Aaron Miles from 2001 to 2005. Kirk's 110 consecutive starts is also an A&M record.

Roster

Information from 2007–08 roster and,  subject to change.

Schedule

|-
!colspan=9| Exhibition

|-
!colspan=9| Regular season

|-
!colspan=9| Postseason Big 12 Tournament

|-
!colspan=9| NCAA Tournament

References

External links
 Official website
 2007–08 NCAA Team national rankings
 Texas A&M Aggies basketball at ESPN.com

Texas A&M Aggies men's basketball seasons
Texas AandM
Texas AandM